Louise Otto (August 30, 1896 – March 9, 1975) was a German freestyle swimmer, who competed in the 1912 Summer Olympics. She was born in Hamburg, Germany. She won a silver medal in the relay together with her teammates Grete Rosenberg, Wally Dressel and Hermine Stindt. Additionally, in the Women's 100 metre freestyle, she competed and was eliminated in the semi-finals.

References

1896 births
1975 deaths
Sportspeople from Hamburg
German female freestyle swimmers
German female swimmers
Olympic swimmers of Germany
Swimmers at the 1912 Summer Olympics
Olympic silver medalists for Germany
Medalists at the 1912 Summer Olympics
Olympic silver medalists in swimming
19th-century German women
20th-century German women